Margaret Highsmith Dickson is a former Democratic member of the North Carolina General Assembly. In 2010, she was in her fourth two-year term representing the state's 44th House district, including constituents in Cumberland and Harnett counties, when she was selected by local Democrats to replace state Senator Tony Rand, who had resigned.
She is a retired broadcaster from Fayetteville, North Carolina.

Dickson has served as the chair of the House Commerce, Small Business, and Entrepreneurship committee and University Board of Governors Nominating committee and as the vice-chair of the committee on Insurance. Dickson was also a member of House Appropriations, Appropriations Subcommittee on Transportation, Education, Education Subcommittee on Universities, and Homeland Security, Military, and Veterans Affairs.

Electoral history

2010

2008

2006

2004

2002

References

External links

|-

|-

Living people
Politicians from Fayetteville, North Carolina
Democratic Party members of the North Carolina House of Representatives
Democratic Party North Carolina state senators
Women state legislators in North Carolina
21st-century American politicians
21st-century American women politicians
1949 births